The Corvette Daytona Prototype is a prototype racing car that began competing in the Rolex series in North America in 2012. It marked Chevrolet's return to Daytona racing as a full constructor, not just as an engine manufacturer. Previously General Motors had competed in Rolex Sports Car Series under the Pontiac brand as well, but shelved that program when they discontinued the Pontiac brand for the 2010 season.

The car raced in Grand-Am competition from 2012 through 2013 as a Daytona Prototype and then continued in the P class in the IMSA Tudor SportsCar Championship Series, now called the WeatherTech SportsCar Championship.

With the change to IMSA racing, the car was updated to compete against ex-ALMS P2 cars. These included carbon brakes, carbon clutch, large rear diffuser (not part of Grand-Am rules), dual element rear wing, and other aerodynamic upgrades. For 2015, an aesthetic upgrade included a C7 style grille, headlights, and taillights.

The 5.5 L port injected LS based GM small-block engine was built by ECR Engines and features individual throttle bodies and a dry sump oil system.

See also
 Chevrolet Corvette GTP
 Cadillac DPi-V.R
 Daytona Prototype

References

Sports prototypes
Daytona
Cars introduced in 2012